Marko Brkić (born 11 April 2000) is a Bosnian football midfielder who plays for Borac Banja Luka.

References

2000 births
Living people
Bosnia and Herzegovina footballers
Bosnia and Herzegovina youth international footballers
FK Zvijezda 09 players
NŠ Mura players
Premier League of Bosnia and Herzegovina players
Slovenian PrvaLiga players
Association football midfielders
Bosnia and Herzegovina expatriate footballers
Expatriate footballers in Serbia
Bosnia and Herzegovina expatriate sportspeople in Serbia
Expatriate footballers in Slovenia
Bosnia and Herzegovina expatriate sportspeople in Slovenia